Steve Yarbrough (born August 29, 1956) is an American author and academic, who teaches at Emerson College.

Life 
Born in Indianola, Mississippi, he received his B.A. and M.A. in English from the University of Mississippi and his M.F.A. in creative writing from the University of Arkansas. Writing largely within the Southern tradition, he draws his themes and characters from Southern history and mores in ways that have been compared to Flannery O'Connor, William Faulkner, and Willie Morris.

Yarbrough's major works include the novels The Realm of Last Chances (2013), Safe From The Neighbors (2010), The End of California (2006), Prisoners of War (2004), Visible Spirits (2001) and The Oxygen Man (1999), as well as short story collections such as Family Men (1990), Mississippi History (1994) and Veneer (1998). The Realm of Last Chances, his first novel set in New England, was published by Knopf 2013.  It won the 2014 Mississippi Institute of Arts and Letters Award in Fiction.  He is also the author of Bookmarked: Larry McMurtry's The Last Picture Show (2017), a nonfiction book describing Yarbrough's own journey to adulthood and becoming an author as it relates the titular novel's protagonist. Yarbrough's latest novel, The Unmade World, was published by Unbridled Books in 2018. It won the 2019 Massachusetts Book Award in Fiction.

His other honors include the Mississippi Authors Award, the California Book Award, and the 2000 Mississippi Institute of Arts and Letters Award in Fiction. The short story "The Rest of Her Life" appeared in The Best American Short Stories 1999. His novel, Prisoners of War, was a finalist for the 2005 PEN/Faulkner award.  He has also won the 2010 Richard Wright Award for Literary Excellence.  His work has been translated into Dutch, Japanese and Polish and published in the United Kingdom.

A professor of creative writing for many years at California State University, Fresno, Yarbrough is currently a professor in the Department of Writing, Literature and Publishing at Emerson College in Boston.

Family 
He is married to the Polish essayist and literary translator Ewa Hryniewicz-Yarbrough and they have two daughters, Antonina Parris-Yarbrough and Lena Yarbrough.  He divides his time between Stoneham, Massachusetts, and Kraków.

Bibliography 
The Unmade World, (2018), 
The Realm of Last Chances (2013), 
 Safe From The Neighbors (2010), 
 The End of California (2006),
 Prisoners of War (2004),
 Visible Spirits (2001) , 
 The Oxygen Man (1999), 
 Short story collections
 Family Men (1990), 
 Mississippi History (1994)
 Veneer (1998). , 
 Non-fiction
 Bookmarked: Larry McMurtry's The Last Picture Show (2017),

References

1956 births
Living people
20th-century American novelists
21st-century American novelists
American male novelists
People from Indianola, Mississippi
PEN/Faulkner Award for Fiction winners
20th-century American male writers
21st-century American male writers
Novelists from Mississippi
20th-century American short story writers
21st-century American short story writers
American male short story writers
University of Mississippi alumni
University of Arkansas alumni
California State University, Fresno faculty
Emerson College faculty